Jerzy Kasalik (born 10 September 1949) is a Polish former footballer who played as a forward. He made three appearances for the Poland national team in 1974.

References

1949 births
Living people
People from Świętochłowice
Polish footballers
Association football forwards
Poland international footballers
Hutnik Nowa Huta players
Legia Warsaw players
Śląsk Wrocław players
ŁKS Łódź players
Lechia Gdańsk players
Lech Poznań players
Polish football managers
Pogoń Szczecin managers
Hutnik Nowa Huta managers
Śląsk Wrocław managers
Wisła Płock managers
Widzew Łódź managers
ŁKS Łódź managers
Lech Poznań managers